Qaqaarissorsuaq Island (old spelling: Qaqârigssorssuaq) is an uninhabited island in Avannaata municipality in northwestern Greenland.

Geography 
The egg-shaped Qaqaarissorsuaq Island is located in Tasiusaq Bay, in the central part of Upernavik Archipelago. The inner waterways of the bay separate it from the surrounding islands: Ateqanngitsorsuaq Island in the southwest, Tasiusaq Island in the west through the Simiuttap Ikerasaa strait, Anarusuk Island in the north, Aukarnersuaq Island in the northeast, and small islands and skerries in the south and southeast.

The island has an undeveloped shoreline. The highest point on the island is an unnamed  peak in the north.

References

Uninhabited islands of Greenland
Tasiusaq Bay
Islands of the Upernavik Archipelago